James McBryer was a Scottish amateur footballer who played as a left back in the Scottish League for Queen's Park.

Personal life 
McBryer studied to be an engineer. He was a volunteer with the British Red Cross during the First World War and also served as a motor boat engineer in Basra, Iraq.

Career statistics

References

1890 births
Scottish footballers
Scottish Football League players
British Army personnel of World War I
Association football fullbacks
Queen's Park F.C. players
Red Cross personnel
Place of death missing
People from Dennistoun
Date of death missing
Scottish engineers